The Salt River Pima–Maricopa Indian Community comprises two distinct Native American tribes—the Pima (O'odham language: Onk Akimel O'odham, meaning "Salt River People") and the Maricopa (Maricopa language: Xalychidom Piipaash, meaning "people who live toward the water")—many of whom were originally of the Halchidhoma (Xalchidom) tribe. The community was officially created by an Executive Order of US President Rutherford B. Hayes on June 14, 1879. The community area includes , of which 19,000 remain a natural preserve. As of 2022, the total population is 7,386. The community is a federally recognized tribe located in Arizona.

The community borders the Arizona cities of Scottsdale, Mesa, Tempe, and Fountain Hills.

The Great Seal of the Salt River Pima–Maricopa Indian Community is a representation of I'itoi, commonly referred to as the Man in the Maze.

Historical Background 
The O'odham (Pima) and Pipaash (Maricopa) peoples lived in villages along the Gila River when white settlers began to arrive. Due to the white settlers removing so much water from the upstream of the River, many O'odham migrated to the Salt River Valley where there was relatively more water. Conflicts over resources and hostility between the white settlers and O'odham resulted in the government establishing the reservation "as a temporary measure to protect Indian rights."

Business enterprises
Since the late 20th century, the community has owned and operated two casinos on its land (Talking Stick Resort), both operating under the "Casino Arizona" brand name. The facilities attract gamblers from the local Phoenix area as well as out-of-state tourists. There is also a limited amount of office development, and a major outdoor shopping center called The Scottsdale Pavilions (featuring national retailers), on the portions of tribal land closest to the northern business and financial districts of neighboring Scottsdale.

In February 2011, the community opened the first Major League Baseball spring training facility on Indian land, Salt River Fields at Talking Stick.  This  baseball complex is the spring training home of the Arizona Diamondbacks and Colorado Rockies.

The community owns and operates the Phoenix Cement Company, which supplies northern Arizona and Phoenix with cement and related products. The company's plant, one of only two large cement manufacturers in Arizona, is in Clarkdale.

The eastern leg of the Loop 101 freeway (Pima freeway) passes through the western edge of the community in a north/south alignment. Both sides of the freeway and all four corners of each interchange within the community are in the domain of the community for development purposes. The alignment of the freeway across community land was a contentious issue within the community and between the community and local and state transportation officials throughout the 1980s.

The streets and roads in the community generally follow the same street grid of the surrounding cities in the Phoenix metropolitan area, such as Phoenix, Scottsdale, and Mesa. Most are two-lane rural roads and are widened somewhat in certain spots to serve vehicular traffic for the casinos and other business enterprises.

Language
The Salt River Pima–Maricopa Indian Community supports the preservation of the Akimel O’odham and Xalchidom Piipaash languages through teaching and learning for everyone within the Community. It encourages all community members to preserve the Akimel O’odham and Xalchidom Piipaash languages within their homes (Council Resolution SR-2026-2000).

Some tribal employees, who work within the community, take language classes so they have a better understanding of the community and people and have a better working relationship with the people they serve. Some learners want to learn more about their own culture, pass on language to their children, and know more about who they are. Some want to learn so they can understand whether their aunts or parents are talking about them.

Extreme poverty, school dropout, drug use, and border issues have also claimed attention within the tribe, hindering progress of language revitalization. Language activists are looking to reverse the language endangerment in their community but a commitment to the goal is needed for them to continue.

Government 
The Salt River community is governed by an elected President, Vice President, and Tribal Council after the tribe adopted its own 1940 constitution under the federal Indian Reorganization Act (IRA) of June 18, 1934. Current President and Vice President are Martin Harvier and Ricardo Leonard, respectively. Current council members include Archie Kashoya; Cheryl Doka; Diane Enos; Thomas Largo, Sr.; Deanna Scabby; Michael Dallas, Sr.; and Wi-Bwa Grey.

Man in the Maze

Central to the beliefs of the Salt River Pima–Maricopa Indian Community is the story of the Man in the Maze, or I'itoi ki:k, which is the symbol seen on the great seal. This ancient pattern (visible at the right) is representative of the journey a person makes through life, including obstacles and problems. The figure is called Elder Brother and he is about to make his way through the maze. At the center, he will find the Sun God, who is there to greet him and bless him into the next world. The symbol belongs to the Akimel O’odham (Pima), Pee-Posh (Maricopa), and Tohono O'odham tribes and is traditionally represented in ancient petroglyphs and traditional basket designs.

Cemetery
The community maintains a cemetery near E. McDowell Road.

Church of Jesus Christ of Latter-day Saints 
The Salt River Pima-Maricopa Indian community is home to the oldest continuous Native American congregation of the Church of Jesus Christ of Latter-day Saints (the Papago ward). In 1997, the church building was rededicated with a ceremony. The newly renovated LDS Mesa Temple Visitors' Center includes a display of the history of the origins of the Salt River community.

Notes

References
 Salt River Pima–Maricopa Indian Community, Community Council Resolution: SR-2026-2000, August 16, 2000

External links
 Official SRPMIC Website

Native American tribes in Arizona
Akimel O'odham
Federally recognized tribes in the United States
American Indian reservations in Arizona
Geography of Maricopa County, Arizona
1879 establishments in Arizona Territory